Bailey Rice (born 10 February 1997) is an American College football punter and former Australian rules footballer who plays for the Charlotte 49ers. He was selected by St Kilda at pick #49 in the 2015 national draft as a father-son selection, with St Kilda matching a bid from Richmond. Carlton had put in a father-son bid for Rice who had nominated St Kilda as his preferred club. He made his senior debut against Collingwood in round 9 of the 2018 season. He was delisted at the conclusion of the 2019 AFL season. In 2021, Rice solidified his switch to American football, accepting a scholarship with the Charlotte 49ers after a stint with Australian training outfit The Punt Factory.

Rice is the son of Dean Rice who played for St Kilda and Carlton.

References

External links

Bailey Rice from AFL Tables

1997 births
Living people
St Kilda Football Club players
Australian rules footballers from Victoria (Australia)
Dandenong Stingrays players
Sandringham Football Club players